Goodenia sepalosa is a species of flowering plant in the family Goodeniaceae and is endemic to northern Australia. It is a prostrate to ascending herb with narrow oblong to lance-shaped leaves, the narrower end towards the base, and racemes of yellow flowers.

Description
Flowering mainly occurs from April to July.

Taxonomy and naming
Goodenia sepalosa was first formally described in 1868 by George Bentham from an unpublished description by Ferdinand von Mueller in Flora Australiensis. The specific epithet (sepalosa) means "abounding in sepals".

Bentham described two varieties of G. sepalosa and in 1990 Roger Charles Carolin described a third. The names of two varieties are accepted by the Australian Plant Census:
 Goodenia sepalosa var. glandulosa Carolin differs from the autonym in having mainly glandular hairs;
 Goodenia sepalosa F.Muell. ex Benth. var. sepalosa, the autonym, has mostly simple hairs.

Distribution
This goodenia grows in sandy soil in the Kimberley region of Western Australia and the northern part of the Northern Territory. Variety glandulosa is only known from the collection made by Norman Byrnes near Derby in 1967.

Conservation status
Goodenia sepalosa is classified as "not threatened" by the Government of Western Australia Department of Parks and Wildlife and of "least concern" under the Northern Territory Government Territory Parks and Wildlife Conservation Act 1976. Variety glandulosa is classified as "Priority Three" by the Government of Western Australia Department of Parks and Wildlife meaning that it is poorly known and known from only a few locations but is not under imminent threat.

References

sepalosa
Eudicots of Western Australia
Plants described in 1868
Taxa named by George Bentham